Pikeville is an unincorporated community in Lockhart Township, Pike County, in the U.S. state of Indiana.

History
Pikeville was laid out in 1859. The community took its name from Pike County. A post office was established at Pikeville in 1867, and remained in operation until it was discontinued in 1938.

Geography

References

Unincorporated communities in Pike County, Indiana
Unincorporated communities in Indiana